This is a list of members of the government of the United Kingdom in office under the leadership of Spencer Perceval from 1809 to 1812.

Cabinet

:

Changes
 December 1809Lord Wellesley succeeds Lord Bathurst as Foreign Secretary. Bathurst continues at the Board of Trade.
 May 1810Lord Mulgrave succeeds Lord Chatham as Master-General of the Ordnance. Charles Philip Yorke succeeds Mulgrave as First Lord of the Admiralty.
 March 1812Lord Castlereagh succeeds Wellesley as Foreign Secretary.
 April 1812Lord Sidmouth succeeds Lord Camden as Lord President. Camden remains in the cabinet as a minister without portfolio.
 May 1812Perceval is shot and killed in the lobby of the House of Commons.

List of ministers

Notes

References

 
 

1809 establishments in the United Kingdom
1812 disestablishments in the United Kingdom
1810s in the United Kingdom
British ministries
Ministries of George III of the United Kingdom
Cabinets established in 1809
Cabinets disestablished in 1812
1800s in the United Kingdom